Marshall Ledbetter, Jr. (June 10, 1969 – July 14, 2003) was an American photographer, psychedelics enthusiast, iconoclast  and unconventional protester.

Protest
In the early morning of June 14, 1991, Ledbetter, then a student at Florida State University, broke into the Florida State Capitol building and phoned a number of odd demands from the office of Wayne Todd, the Sergeant At Arms of the Florida Senate. This triggered a police standoff (the police were not sure whether Ledbetter was armed or if he might have a hostage) that eventually ended peacefully. One recounting of the events stated:

He told them that he wanted (among other things) a large Gumby's pizza, a case of beer and $100 worth of Chinese food. The demand note was not sent directly to the police but was faxed to the song request fax line of Gulf 104, a local rock station. The police surrounded the capitol building and set up SWAT teams and snipers throughout the area, while Marshall Ledbetter demanded that the police get the following people on the telephone so that he could talk to them: Timothy Leary, Jello Biafra, Ice Cube and Lemmy Kilmister. 

Wayne Todd remembered the event this way:

Of the many apocryphal stories surrounding Ledbetter's standoff, perhaps none is more famous than the request for donuts contained in his demand note. While it was widely reported that Ledbetter had asked for  "666 jelly donuts", a read of his actual demand note clearly shows he was ordering donuts from Dunkin' Donuts for the police: "666 Dunkin' Donuts for my fine friends in the TPD (Tallahassee Police Department), FSUPD (Florida State University Police Department) and the LCSD (Leon County Sheriff's Department)."

After the standoff, Marshall was taken to the Florida State Hospital at Chattahoochee where he was eventually forced by court order to accept anti-psychotic drug treatment. On the Florida State campus that fall (especially among the members of student government party the Monarchy Party), Marshall became something of a folk hero, with a few souls wearing homemade "Free Marshall Ledbetter Now" T-shirts (although an account from one FSU alumna states that they were really FMLN shirts and buttons borrowed from a local left-wing group supporting El Salvador's Frente Farabundo Martí para la Liberación Nacional). Marshall unsuccessfully attempted to escape from Chattahoochee that fall.

Personal life
Marshall grew up in Auburndale, Florida. He was an avid photographer and worked at his father's camera store, Marshall's Camera. He always seemed to have a camera and generously shared his photos. He was an enthusiast of the Church of the SubGenius. He had one daughter.

Ledbetter died by suicide in 2003.

Influence on pop culture 
Jello Biafra penned "The Ballad of Marshall Ledbetter" for his band Lard (the song was released in 2000). While Biafra never met Ledbetter, he said "I have spoken with him. He was lucky to get out of there alive. If it had happened now, I’m sure they would have just gone in there and blown the place up, or just done it Waco-style. He was institutionalized, and now he's back out again walking the straight and narrow. But he sends me some odd anecdotes in the mail now and then. He was somebody who had had enough of the injustice in our world and chose to do something about it in very colorful fashion. I’ve been a long time fan of creative crime. The best part about this one is, it made a statement, it was a work of art, and not a single person got hurt."

References
Harrison, Daniel. Making Sense of Marshall Ledbetter: Politics, Protest, and Madness in the Florida Capitol. Gainesville, FL: University Press of Florida, 2014. Print.  Page at University Press of Florida website Page at Amazon.com

Footnotes

External links 
 

1969 births
2003 suicides
American SubGenii
People from Bartow, Florida
American psychedelic drug advocates